Magway Township is a township of Magway District in the Magway Region of Myanmar.  The principal town is Magway.

Bounds
Magway Township is bounded by the following townships:
 Yenangyaung to the north;
 Natmauk to the northeast;
 Myothit to the east;
 Taungdwingyi to the southeast;
 Minhla and Minbu to the west;
 Pwintbyu to the northwest.

Notes

External links
 "Magwe Google Satellite Map" Maplandia

Townships of Magway Region